Dazed and Confused is a 1993 American coming-of-age comedy film written and directed by Richard Linklater. The film features a large ensemble cast of actors who would later become stars, including Jason London, Ben Affleck, Milla Jovovich, Cole Hauser, Parker Posey, Adam Goldberg, Matthew McConaughey, Nicky Katt, Joey Lauren Adams, and Rory Cochrane. The plot follows the exploits of several Austin, Texas teenagers during the last day of school in 1976. 

Released on September 24, 1993 Dazed and Confused was a commercial disappointment at the box office, grossing less than $8 million in the United States. The film found later success on home video market and has since become a cult classic. It ranked third on Entertainment Weekly magazine's list of the 50 Best High School Movies. The magazine also ranked it 10th on its "Funniest Movies of the Past 25 Years" list.

Plot
It is May 28, 1976, the last day of school at Lee High School in Austin, Texas. The next year's group of seniors are preparing for the annual hazing of incoming freshmen. Randall "Pink" Floyd, the school's star football player, is asked to sign a pledge promising not to take drugs during the summer or do anything that would "jeopardize the goal of a championship season". When classes end, the incoming freshman boys are hunted down by the seniors and paddled. The incoming freshman girls are also hazed; they are rounded up in the school parking lot by senior girls, covered in mustard, ketchup, flour and raw eggs and forced to propose to senior boys.

As day fades to night, freshman Mitch Kramer escapes the initial hazing with his best friend Carl Burnett, but is later cornered after a baseball game and violently paddled. Fred O'Bannion, a senior participating in the hazing tradition for a second year after failing to graduate, delights in punishing Mitch. Pink gives the injured Mitch a ride home and offers to take him cruising with friends that night. Plans for the evening are ruined when Kevin Pickford's parents discover his intention to host a keg party. Elsewhere, the intellectual trio of Cynthia Dunn, Tony Olson, and Mike Newhouse decide to participate in the evening's festivities. Pink and his friend David Wooderson, a man in his early 20s who still socializes with high school students, pick up Mitch and head for the Emporium, a pool hall frequented by teenagers.

As the night progresses, students loiter around the Emporium, listen to rock music, cruise the neighborhood and frequent a local drive-through restaurant. Mitch is introduced to sophomore Julie Simms, with whom he shares a mutual attraction. While cruising again with Pink, Pickford and Don Dawson, Mitch drinks beer and smokes marijuana for the first time. After a game of mailbox baseball, a neighborhood resident brandishing a gun threatens to call the police. They barely escape after the resident fires at their car. After returning to the Emporium, Mitch runs into his middle school friends. They hatch a plan to exact revenge on O'Bannion. It culminates with them dumping paint on O'Bannion, who leaves in a fit of rage.

After the Emporium closes, an impromptu keg party is planned in a field under a moonlight tower. Cynthia, Tony, and Mike arrive at their first keg party, where Mike is threatened by tough guy Clint Bruno. Tony runs into freshman Sabrina Davis, whom he met earlier during the hazing and they begin hanging out together. Cynthia likes Wooderson and exchanges phone numbers with him. Mike, suffering from the humiliation of his confrontation with Clint, decides to make a stand by punching him; in return, he gets tackled by Clint and receives a beating from him. The fight is broken up by Pink and Wooderson. Football player Benny O'Donnell confronts Pink about his refusal to sign the pledge. Pink, the only player not to have signed, believes it violates his individuality and beliefs. Mitch leaves the keg party with Julie. They drive to a nearby hill overlooking town to make out. Tony gives Sabrina a ride home and they kiss goodnight.

As night turns to dawn, Pink, Wooderson, Don, Ron Slater and several other friends decide to smoke marijuana on the 50-yard line of the football field. The police arrive so they ditch the drugs. Recognizing Pink and Dawson, the police call Coach Conrad, his football coach. Conrad lectures Pink about hanging out with "losers" and insists that he sign the pledge. Pink says that he might play football, but he is not going to sign it. Pink leaves with his friends to Houston to obtain tickets to an Aerosmith concert. Mitch arrives home after sunrise to find his mother has waited up for him. She decides against punishment, but warns him about coming home late again. Mitch goes to his bedroom, puts on headphones, and listens to "Slow Ride" by Foghat, as Pink, Wooderson, Slater, and Simone Kerr travel down a highway to purchase their tickets.

Cast

Production

Development
When asked in an interview what he wanted to do after Slacker, director Richard Linklater said "I want to make this teenage rock'n'roll spree. I knew I wanted the story to take place on one day in the spring of 1976, but at one point it was much more experimental. The whole movie took place in a car with the characters driving around listening to ZZ Top." Lee Daniel, the director of photography, described the concept: "It would have been two shots—one of a guy putting in an eight-track of ZZ Top's Fandango! and one of two guys driving around talking. The film would be the length of the actual album, and you'd hear each track in the background as a source." Eventually, Linklater decided to write a script "to represent different points of view", the first draft of which took a month to complete. Universal Studios fast tracked production of Linklater's script, jumping ahead of 30 other films which were in development at that time.

Casting
Casting searches were done in Austin, New York, and Los Angeles. Vince Vaughn was almost cast as the bully O'Bannion before Ben Affleck was chosen. As Linklater put it, "Ben was smart and full of life. You don't cast the unappealing person, you cast the appealing person." Other young actors considered for roles include Elizabeth Berkley, Mira Sorvino, Ashley Judd, Brendan Fraser, Jon Favreau, Ron Livingston and Claire Danes. Casting director Don Phillips said, "We wanted Claire Danes for the girl, but she was too young. She couldn't leave school." Renee Zellweger has a nonspeaking role in the film, but was originally considered for the part of Darla, which went to Parker Posey instead. Linklater said, "Parker was just crazier." Wiley Wiggins was the "big find" in Austin, according to Linklater, who described him as "a 15-year-old with all the bad habits of a grad student: smoking cigarettes, hanging out at coffee shops, my kind of guy."

Some roles which were intended to be larger were reduced. The Kevin Pickford character, played by Shawn Andrews, was meant to be a larger role, but due to his behavior with other cast members, Pickford's screen time was cut in favor of Matthew McConaughey's character, Wooderson. Linklater recalled "There was another actor, [Shawn Andrews], who was kind of the opposite [of McConaughey]. He wasn't really getting along with everybody. I could tell the actors weren't responding to him." Linklater had to break up a fight between Andrews and London at one point. On screen, the two characters barely speak to each other during the film. Milla Jovovich, who played Michelle, Pickford's girlfriend, had her role reduced because, in Linklater's words, "it didn't really gel."

McConaughey was not originally cast in the film, as the role of Wooderson was originally small and meant to be cast locally for budget purposes. He was a film student at the University of Texas in Austin and went out drinking with his girlfriend one night. They ended up at the Hyatt hotel bar since his friend was a bartender there and could get them a discount. He approached casting director Phillips in the bar. Phillips recalls, "The bartender says to him, 'See that guy down there? That's Don Phillips. He cast Sean Penn in Fast Times.' And Matthew goes, 'I'm gonna go down and talk to this guy.'" Phillips also recalls that Linklater didn't like McConaughey at first because he was "too handsome." Much of the Wooderson role was improvised or written on the spot, giving McConaughey more screen time.

Reception
Dazed and Confused was released on September 24, 1993, in 183 theaters, grossing $918,127 on its opening weekend. It went on to make $7.9 million in North America.

The film received positive reviews from critics. On review aggregator Rotten Tomatoes, it has a 92% approval rating based on 62 reviews, with a weighted average rating of 7.90/10. The website's critical consensus reads: "Featuring an excellent ensemble cast, a precise feel for the 1970s, and a killer soundtrack, Dazed and Confused is a funny, affectionate, and clear-eyed look at high school life." Metacritic provides a score of 78 out of 100 from 19 critics, indicating "generally favorable" reviews.

Film critic Roger Ebert awarded the film three stars out of four, praising the film as "art crossed with anthropology" with a "painful underside". Janet Maslin of The New York Times wrote, "Dazed and Confused has an enjoyably playful spirit, one that amply compensates for its lack of structure". Desson Howe of The Washington Post, wrote, "Dazed succeeds on its own terms and reflects American culture so well, it becomes part of it". In her review for The Austin Chronicle, Marjorie Baumgarten gave particular praise to Matthew McConaughey's performance: "He is a character we're all too familiar with in the movies but McConaughey nails this guy without a hint of condescension or whimsy, claiming this character for all time as his own".

Rolling Stone'''s Peter Travers gave the film four stars out of four, and praised Linklater as a "sly and formidable talent, bringing an anthropologist's eye to this spectacularly funny celebration of the rites of stupidity. His shitfaced American Graffiti is the ultimate party movie – loud, crude, socially irresponsible and totally irresistible". In his review for Time, Richard Corliss wrote, "Linklater is surely no ham-fisted moralist, and his film has lots of attitude to shake a finger at. But it also has enough buoyant '70s music to shake anybody's tail feather, and a kind of easy jubilance of narrative and character". Owen Gleiberman of Entertainment Weekly gave the film an "A" rating, and wrote, "Yet if Linklater captures the comic goofiness of the time, he also evokes its liberating spirit. The film finds its meaning in the subtle clash between the older, sadistic macho-jock ethos and the follow-your-impulse hedonism that was the lingering legacy of the '60s".

Legacy
Quentin Tarantino included it on his list of the 10 greatest films of all time in the 2002 Sight and Sound poll. In 2003, Entertainment Weekly ranked the film #17 on its list of "The Top 50 Cult Films", third on its list of the 50 Best High School Movies, 10th on its "Funniest Movies of the Past 25 Years" list, and ranked it #6 on its "The Cult 25: The Essential Left-Field Movie Hits Since '83" list.

In October 2004, three of Linklater's former classmates from Huntsville High School, whose surnames are Wooderson, Slater, and Floyd, filed a defamation lawsuit against Linklater, claiming to be the basis for the similarly named characters on the film. The lawsuit was filed in New Mexico rather than Texas because New Mexico has a longer statute of limitations. The suit was subsequently dismissed.

In 2012, McConaughey reprised his role as Wooderson in the Butch Walker and The Black Widows music video "Synthesizers". To celebrate the film's 20th anniversary in 2013, the film received the Star of Texas award from the Texas Film Hall of Fame. Linklater accepted the award after being introduced by Tarantino, who reiterated his appreciation of the film as his favorite of the 1990s. The event featured a reunion of several cast members including Joey Lauren Adams, Wiley Wiggins, Christin Hinojosa, Nicky Katt, Mona Lee, Catherine Avril Morris, Anthony Rapp, Marissa Ribisi, Michelle Burke Thomas, and Mark Vandermeulen. At the event, Linklater described his intent to create an inverse John Hughes film: "The drama is so low-key in [Dazed & Confused]. I don't remember teenage being that dramatic. I remember just trying to go with the flow, socialize, fit in and be cool. The stakes were really low. To get Aerosmith tickets or not? That's a big thing. It was really rare when the star-crossed lovers from the opposite side of the tracks and the girl gets pregnant and there's a car crash and somebody dies. That didn't really happen much. But riding around and trying to look for something to do with the music cranked up, now that happened a lot!"

After Boyhood was released Linklater announced that his next film, Everybody Wants Some!!, would be a "spiritual sequel" to Dazed and Confused. The newer film takes place at a Texas college in 1980.

The line "alright, alright, alright" became a catchphrase for Matthew McConaughey.The Origin Of Matthew McConaughey's 'Alright, Alright, Alright' George Stroumboulopoulos Tonight on CBC 2014-03-03

Rotten Tomatoes' editorial team credits the film for "putting Austin, Texas on the map."

Home video
MCA/Universal released Dazed and Confused on laserdisc in January 1994, followed by a VHS release two months later.

The film was released on HD DVD in 2006. The Criterion Collection released a two-disc boxed-set edition of the film on June 6, 2006, in the U.S. and Canada. Features included an audio commentary by Richard Linklater, deleted scenes, the original trailer, the 50 minute "Making Dazed" documentary that aired on the American Movie Classics channel on September 18, 2005, on-set interviews, behind-the-scenes footage, cast auditions and footage from the ten-year anniversary celebration. Also included is a 72-page book featuring new essays by Kent Jones, Jim DeRogatis, and Chuck Klosterman as well as memories from the cast and crew, character profiles and a mini reproduction of the original film poster designed by Frank Kozik. Entertainment Weekly gave it an "A" rating and stated that it "grants this enduring cult classic the DVD treatment it deserves".

Universal Studios released Dazed and Confused on Blu-ray in August 2011, in a 1080p/AVC MPEG-4 transfer, with a DTS-HD Master Audio 5.1 soundtrack.The Blunt Truth is a four-minute and twenty second long 1970s anti-cannabis hoax educational film. It appeared as a bonus feature on 2004's Dazed and Confused: Flashback Party Edition''.

Soundtrack
The soundtrack for the film was released on September 28, 1993, by The Medicine Label, and they consist of hit songs (mostly rock) from the 1970s, the film's setting. The songs "Hurricane" by Bob Dylan, "Hey Baby" by Ted Nugent, and "Sweet Emotion" by Aerosmith were also included in the film, but not on the commercial soundtracks. "The Alien Song (For Those Who Listen)" by Milla Jovovich was briefly performed by Jovovich's character Michelle Burroughs, but was not included in the soundtrack either. Geffen Records attempted to get up-and-coming band Jackyl to do a cover of Grand Funk's "We're an American Band" to play over the end credits and be released as a single, but Linklater refused.

Certifications

Book
In September 1993, St. Martin's Press published a 127-page, softcover book inspired by Richard Linklater's screenplay. It was compiled by Linklater, Denise Montgomery, and others, and designed by Erik Josowitz. It was presented as a kind of yearbook, with character profiles, essays by characters, a timeline focusing on the years 1973 to 1977, and various 1970s pop culture charts and quizzes. It also featured dozens of black-and-white photos from the film.

References

External links

 
 
 
 
 Dazed and Confused: Dream On . . . an essay by Kent Jones at the Criterion Collection

1993 films
1993 comedy films
1993 independent films
1990s coming-of-age comedy films
1990s high school films
1990s teen comedy films
American coming-of-age comedy films
American films about cannabis
American high school films
American independent films
American teen comedy films
1990s English-language films
Films about bullying
Films about hazing
Films directed by Richard Linklater
Films produced by James Jacks
Films set in 1976
Films set in Austin, Texas
Films shot in Austin, Texas
Gramercy Pictures films
Hyperlink films
Middle school films
Stoner films
1990s American films